Crossing the Border may refer to:

 The Daring Young Man on the Flying Trapeze (short stories), a collection of short stories by William Saroyan
 The Daring Young Man on the Flying Trapeze (song),  a 19th-century popular song
 Man on the Flying Trapeze, a 1935 comedy film